is a park in Arakawa, Tokyo. It was first opened in 1974, and is built on artificial ground placed over the Tokyo Mikawashima Wastewater Treatment Plant. The park features a garden, playground, bicycle track for children, baseball field, and tennis courts. In 1982 it was selected as one of the 'New Tokyo 100 Views.'

Facilities
 Tennis courts
 Athletic corner
 Wildflower area
 Swan pond
 Omurasaki Observation Garden — Japanese emperor butterflies can be seen here in the summer
 Insect observation garden — Various beetles can be seen here in the summer
 Waterfront open space
 Observation platform

Access
 By train: 10 minutes’ walk from Machiya Station on the Keisei Main Line and Tokyo Metro Chiyoda Line

See also
 Parks and gardens in Tokyo
 National Parks of Japan

References

 Website of Japan Travel K.K.

External links
 Website of Live Japan

Parks and gardens in Tokyo
Arakawa, Tokyo